Nuno Luís Costa Santos (born 20 April 1973) is a Portuguese retired professional footballer who played as a goalkeeper, currently a goalkeeping coach.

Playing career
Born in Setúbal, Santos made his professional debut with his hometown club Vitória FC, also serving two loans with lowly teams (Caldas S.C. and CD Operário). His performances in the 1997–98 campaign attracted the attention of Leeds United, but he made no official appearances whatsoever for the Premier League side, returning to his country with S.L. Benfica.

During his stint in Lisbon, Santos was almost always only third choice, and went on to also serve several loans, including in Spain's CD Badajoz, playing no games in the Segunda División during his four-month spell. Released by Benfica in June 2004 after a season-long loan spell at Vitória, he stabilised at C.D. Santa Clara – which he had already represented on loan from Benfica – starting in two of his three campaigns in the Azores.

After one year in North America, appearing for both the Rochester Raging Rhinos and Toronto FC, Santos returned to Portugal and played in slightly more than half of the league's matches for Gondomar SC, with the club, also in the Segunda Liga, being relegated. In the summer, he dropped down to the third tier and joined F.C. Arouca.

Coaching career
Upon retiring at the age of 39, Santos worked as goalkeeper coach of the Canadian national team. In 2018, in the same capacity, he signed with Lille OSC of the French Ligue 1.

Santos moved to English club Tottenham Hotspur in November 2019, still in that role. After the dismissal of manager José Mourinho on 19 April 2021, the entire coaching staff was relieved of their duties. On 7 April 2022, while working as goalkeeping coach of A.S. Roma, he was involved in an altercation with the head coach of FK Bodø/Glimt following a UEFA Europa Conference League quarter-final match.

References

External links

1973 births
Living people
Sportspeople from Setúbal
Portuguese footballers
Association football goalkeepers
Primeira Liga players
Liga Portugal 2 players
Segunda Divisão players
Vitória F.C. players
Caldas S.C. players
CD Operário players
S.L. Benfica footballers
C.D. Santa Clara players
S.C. Beira-Mar players
Gondomar S.C. players
F.C. Arouca players
Leeds United F.C. players
CD Badajoz players
Rochester New York FC players
Toronto FC players
Cypriot Second Division players
Ethnikos Assia FC players
Portuguese expatriate footballers
Expatriate footballers in England
Expatriate footballers in Spain
Expatriate soccer players in the United States
Expatriate soccer players in Canada
Expatriate footballers in Cyprus
Portuguese expatriate sportspeople in England
Portuguese expatriate sportspeople in Spain
Portuguese expatriate sportspeople in the United States
Portuguese expatriate sportspeople in Canada
Portuguese expatriate sportspeople in Cyprus
Portuguese expatriate sportspeople in France
Portuguese expatriate sportspeople in Italy
Lille OSC non-playing staff
Tottenham Hotspur F.C. non-playing staff
A.S. Roma non-playing staff